Auburn is a city in Nemaha County, Nebraska, United States, and its county seat.  The population was 3,470 at the 2020 census.

History
Auburn is an incorporation of two towns. Calvert and Sheridan combined to form Auburn in 1882, in part to have the voting power to wrestle the county seat away from Brownville, Nebraska, a village located ten miles east. The incorporation was successful, and in 1883, Auburn was named the county seat. The city is named after Auburn, New York.

The only person to be elected to the United States Congress as a member of the Prohibitionist Party, Charles Hiram Randall, was born in Auburn on July 23, 1865.

From 1910 to 1913, Auburn was home to the Auburn Athletics, a Class C level minor league baseball team. The Auburn Athletics played as members of the Missouri-Iowa-Nebraska-Kansas League for the duration of the league. The Auburn Athletics played home games at the Legion Memorial Park. Still in use today, Legion Memorial Park is designated as a National Historic Park site. The address is 1015 J Street.

Geography and climate
Auburn is located at  (40.388278, -95.842246).

Demographics

2010 census
As of the census of 2010, there were 3,460 people, 1,487 households, and 910 families residing in the city. The racial makeup of the city was 97.3% White, 0.5% African American, 0.2% Native American, 0.7% Asian, 0.3% from other races, and 1.0% from two or more races. Hispanic or Latino of any race were 1.9% of the population.

There were 1,487 households, of which 28.7% had children under the age of 18 living with them, 48.6% were married couples living together, 9.5% had a female householder with no husband present, 3.1% had a male householder with no wife present, and 38.8% were non-families. 33.9% of all households were made up of individuals, and 16.9% had someone living alone who was 65 years of age or older. The average household size was 2.26 and the average family size was 2.87.

The median age in the city was 42.1 years. 24.1% of residents were under the age of 18; 7.2% were between the ages of 18 and 24; 22.4% were from 25 to 44; 26.7% were from 45 to 64; and 19.7% were 65 years of age or older. The gender makeup of the city was 46.9% male and 53.1% female.

2000 census
As of the census of 2000, there were 3,350 people, 1,479 households, and 924 families residing in the city. The population density was 2,184.1 people per square mile (845.4/km). There were 1,642 housing units at an average density of 1,070.5 per square mile (414.4/km). The racial makeup of the city was 97.19% White, 0.36% African American, 0.27% Native American, 1.04% Asian, 0.03% Pacific Islander, 0.30% from other races, and 0.81% from two or more races. Hispanic or Latino of any race were 0.81% of the population.

There were 1,479 households, out of which 29.1% had children under the age of 18 living with them, 50.4% were married couples living together, 9.5% had a female householder with no husband present, and 37.5% were non-families. 33.3% of all households were made up of individuals, and 18.8% had someone living alone who was 65 years of age or older. The average household size was 2.24 and the average family size was 2.86.

In the city, the population was spread out, with 24.3% under the age of 18, 7.3% from 18 to 24, 26.4% from 25 to 44, 22.5% from 45 to 64, and 19.4% who were 65 years of age or older. The median age was 40 years. For every 100 females, there were 88.8 males. For every 100 females age 18 and over, there were 86.0 males.

In 2000, the median household income was $34,207 and the median family income was $46,563. Males had a median income of $35,719 compared with $18,246 for females. The per capita income for the city was $18,523. About 7.2% of families and 13.2% of the population were below the poverty line, including 16.0% of those under age 18 and 14.4% of those age 65 or over.

Notable Elzada Clover
 Chad Kelsay, professional American football player
 Neal Obermeyer, editorial cartoonist
 Charles Hiram Randall, U.S. Representative from California

References

External links
 City of Auburn

Cities in Nebraska
Cities in Nemaha County, Nebraska
County seats in Nebraska
Populated places established in 1882
1882 establishments in Nebraska